Okinawa 3rd district is a constituency of the House of Representatives in the Diet of Japan (national legislature). It is located in Okinawa Prefecture and encompasses the cities of Nago, Okinawa, Uruma, Kunigami District and parts of Shimajiri District (Iheya and Izena). As of 2016, 312,171 eligible voters were registered in the district.

The district was last represented by Denny Tamaki of the Liberal Party who automatically forfeited his seat after becoming a gubernatorial candidate in September 2018. The by-election was not expected to be held in the immediate by-election slot in October 2018, but probably only in April 2019 or even later because a Supreme Court decision on the constitutionality of the malapportionment in the last general election to the House of Representatives is still pending. Thy by-election date was later announced to be 21 April 2019. In the 2019 election, Tomohiro Yara, freelance journalist and strong opponent of the relocation of the Futenma US Marine base, defeated Aiko Shimajiri, former member of the Diet Upper House and minister. However, the 2021 general elections reversed the results. Reportedly, this was due to increased support for the LDP among younger voters because of the party's harder line on China and proactive security policy.

List of representatives

Election results

References 

Districts of the House of Representatives (Japan)